Ephysteris juvenilis is a moth in the family Gelechiidae. It was described by Edward Meyrick in 1929. It is found in Assam, India.

References

Ephysteris
Moths described in 1929